Nyal is a rural locality (a railway station) in Kolsky District of Murmansk Oblast, Russia, located beyond the Arctic Circle. Population: 7 (2010 Census).

References

Notes

Sources

Rural localities in Murmansk Oblast